José Ignacio Gutiérrez Cataluña (born 1 December 1977 in Valencia) is a Spanish former cyclist.

Major results
2004
1st Stage 2b Vuelta a Extremadura
1st Stage 4 Circuito Montañés

References

1977 births
Living people
Spanish male cyclists
Sportspeople from Valencia
Cyclists from the Valencian Community